Curtis G. Johnson (born September 29, 1952) is an American politician and a Republican member of the Tennessee House of Representatives representing District 68 since January 2005.

Education
Johnson earned his BBA from Austin Peay State University.

Elections
In 2004, to challenge District 68 incumbent Democratic Representative Tommy Head, Johnson ran in the August 5, 2004 Republican Primary, winning with 1,104 votes (77.9%), and won the November 2, 2004 General election with 13,044 votes (55.3%) against Representative Head.

In 2006 Johnson was unopposed for the August 3, 2006 Republican Primary, winning with 4,118 votes, and won the November 7, 2006 General election with 10,158 votes (55.5%) against Democratic nominee Tim Barnes.

In 2008 Johnson was unopposed for both the August 7, 2008 Republican Primary, winning with 1,471 votes, and the November 4, 2008 General election, winning with 18,177 votes.

In 2010 Johnson was unopposed for the August 5, 2010 Republican Primary, winning with 5,545 votes, and won the November 2, 2010 General election with 10,804 votes (64.7%) against Democratic nominee Brett Ramsey.

In 2012 Johnson was unopposed for both the August 2, 2012 Republican Primary, winning with 2,253 votes, and the November 6, 2012 General election, winning with 18,376 votes.

References

External links
Official page at the Tennessee General Assembly

Curtis Johnson at Ballotpedia
Curtis G. Johnson at the National Institute on Money in State Politics

1952 births
21st-century American politicians
Austin Peay State University alumni
Living people
Republican Party members of the Tennessee House of Representatives
People from Clarksville, Tennessee
Place of birth missing (living people)